Craig David Tanner (born 27 October 1994) is an English professional footballer who plays as a striker or winger who plays for Ebbsfleet United. Tanner began his career with Reading and spent time on loan at AFC Wimbledon and Plymouth Argyle (twice) before joining Motherwell in June 2017.

Career

Reading
Tanner joined Reading's under-8s academy team in 2003. In March 2011, Tanner signed his first professional contract with Reading, going through to the end of the 2014–15 season. Tanner made his debut, and scored his first goal, for Reading in their 3–1 League Cup victory over Newport County on 12 August 2014, coming on as a substitute.

On 22 January 2015, Tanner signed a new contract with Reading, lasting until the summer of 2017, and joined AFC Wimbledon on loan for the rest of the season.

Plymouth Argyle (loans)
On 5 August 2015 Tanner signed for Plymouth Argyle on loan until 2 January 2016. Tanner scored his first goal for the club, a stunning volley from the edge of the area, in a 2–1 defeat against Gillingham in the League Cup. On 6 January 2016, Tanner's loan at Plymouth Argyle was extended until the end of the season.

On 18 August 2016, Tanner returned to Plymouth Argyle on loan until 16 January 2017, extending his stay until the end of the season on 16 January 2017.

Motherwell
On 5 June 2017, Motherwell announced the signing of Tanner on a two-year contract. He made his debut for the club away to Queen's Park in the group stage of the Scottish League Cup, scoring Motherwell's second goal in a 5–1 win. He scored his first league goal on 30 September 2017, in a 3–0 win at home against Partick Thistle. Tanner's first season at Motherwell ended early when he suffered a knee injury in training, described by manager Stephen Robinson as a "freak incident" which was expected to keep him out for up to six months.

In November 2018, having twice undergone surgery on his injury, Motherwell assistant manager Keith Lasley announced that Tanner would remain out until at least January 2019. Having failed to feature during the 2018–19 season, he was offered a short-term contract with a view to an extension upon his return to fitness.

Having made his return to action he featured for Motherwell's reserve side. However, on 2 September 2019, he left the club having turned down their contract offer.

Aldershot Town
On 9 December 2019, Aldershot Town announced the signing of Tanner on a contract until the end of the 2019/20 season.

Ebbsfleet United
On 21 June 2021, Tanner joined National League South side Ebbsfleet United, rejecting a contract extension with Aldershot.

Career statistics

Honours

Club
Reading
 U21 Premier League Cup (1): 2013–14

References

External links
Craig Tanner profile at Reading F.C.

1994 births
Living people
English footballers
England youth international footballers
Association football forwards
Reading F.C. players
AFC Wimbledon players
Plymouth Argyle F.C. players
Motherwell F.C. players
Aldershot Town F.C. players
Ebbsfleet United F.C. players
English Football League players
Scottish Professional Football League players
National League (English football) players
Footballers from Surrey
People from Camberley